A non-binding referendum on ending conscription was held in Austria on 20 January 2013. The proposal was supported by the Social Democratic Party and the Green Party and opposed by the Austrian People's Party and the FPÖ. Though constitutionally not obliged to act on, both parties in government stated that they would honour the results.

The motion to end conscription and introduce a professional army was rejected.

Results

References

Referendums in Austria
2013 elections in Austria
2013 referendums
Conscription in Austria
Conscription referendums
January 2013 events in Europe